The province of Diyarbakr was a short-lived province of the Safavid Empire located in the area of present-day Turkey. Amida (Medieval Diyarbakır) was the provincial capital, and the seat of the Safavid governors. It had the following administrative jurisdictions; Orfah (Urfa), Jazireh (Cizre), Kharput (Elazığ), Mardin, Sert (Siirt), and Hesn Keyfeh (Hasankeyf).

Sources
 
 
 

Provinces of the Safavid dynasty
History of Şanlıurfa Province
History of Diyarbakır Province
History of Şırnak Province
History of Elazığ Province
History of Mardin Province
History of Siirt Province
History of Batman Province